Ornduffia is a genus of flowering plants in the family Menyanthaceae, native to Australia. Aquatic or wetland herbs, they were split off from Villarsia in 2009.

Species
Currently accepted species include:

Ornduffia albiflora (F.Muell.) Tippery & Les
Ornduffia calthifolia (F.Muell.) Tippery & Les
Ornduffia marchantii (Ornduff) Tippery & Les
Ornduffia parnassiifolia (Labill.) Tippery & Les
Ornduffia reniformis (R.Br.) Tippery & Les
Ornduffia submersa (Aston) Tippery & Les
Ornduffia umbricola (Aston) Tippery & Les

References

 
Asterales genera